The Upper Guinea Creoles are Portuguese-based creole languages, based in West Africa, that have Portuguese as their substantial lexifier.

It includes the languages:
 Cape Verdean Creole, spoken in Cape Verde.
 Guinea-Bissau Creole, spoken in Guinea-Bissau, and Casamance, Senegal.                           
 Papiamento, spoken in Aruba, Bonaire, and Curaçao.